Michelle Udall ( Miles; born March 23, 1976) is an American politician and a former Republican member of the Arizona House of Representatives elected to represent District 25 in 2016 until 2023. She is also a former member of the Mesa school board.

Biography 
Michelle Miles married Jesse Udall, the namesake grandson of Jesse Addison Udall and a member of the prominent Udall family. She has been described by The Arizona Republic as a moderate Republican.

In February 2022, Udall alongside fellow Republican Arizona House members Regina Cobb and Joanne Osborne crossed party lines to vote against HB 2811, a bill that would have banned manufacturing or prescribing medication that would cause an abortion, citing the multiple uses of those medications.

Elections
 2014 - Udall was defeated in the Arizona House of Representatives District 25 Republican Primary by incumbent Justin Olson and Russell Bowers.
 2016 - Udall and incumbent Russell Bowers defeated Ross Groen in the Republican Primary and went on to defeat Democrat Kathleen Rahn in the general election.

References

External links
 Biography at Ballotpedia

1976 births
21st-century American politicians
21st-century American women politicians
Living people
Republican Party members of the Arizona House of Representatives
Politicians from Mesa, Arizona
School board members in Arizona
Udall family
Women state legislators in Arizona